Browns Mill is an unincorporated community in Preston County, in the U.S. state of West Virginia.

History
An old variant name was Zinns Mill, after the local Zinn family. A post office called Zinns Mills was in operation from 1862 until 1864.

References

Unincorporated communities in Preston County, West Virginia
Unincorporated communities in West Virginia